Gorgeous bushshrike may refer to:
 The species Telophorus viridis which includes the subspecies T. v. viridis, T. v. nigricauda,  T. v. quartus and  T. v. quadricolor, and is also known as the four-colored bushshrike.
 The subspecies Telophorus viridis viridis, which is also known as Perrin's bushshrike.

Animal common name disambiguation pages